Leptocypris lujae is a species of cyprinid fish found in Congo River up to the Lualaba River in the Democratic Republic of Congo and the Central African Republic.

References

Leptocypris
Danios
Fish of Africa
Fish described in 1909